Prezens is an album by guitarist David Torn recorded in 2005 and released on the ECM label.

Reception
The Allmusic review by Thom Jurek awarded the album 4½ stars stating "Prezens is one of those recordings where free improvisation and composition find an uneasy but cooperative working relationship making for one compelling listen after another".

Track listing
All compositions by David Torn except as indicated
 "AK" (Tim Berne, Tom Rainey, Craig Taborn, David Torn) - 9:19 
 "Rest & Unrest" - 3:45 
 "Structural Functions of Prezens" (Berne, Rainey, Taborn, Torn) - 10:58 
 "Bulbs" (Berne, Rainey, Taborn, Torn) - 6:21 
 "Them Buried Standing" - 2:43 
 "Sink" (Berne, Rainey, Taborn, Torn) - 7:16 
 "Neck-Deep in the Harrow..." (Berne, Rainey, Taborn, Torn) - 12:33 
 "Ever More Other" - 4:13 
 "Ring for Endless Travel" - 2:24 
 "Miss Place, The Mist..." (Matt Chamberlain, Torn) - 5:46 
 "Transmit Regardless" (Berne, Rainey, Taborn, Torn) - 7:20 
Recorded at Clubhouse Studios in Rhinebeck, New York in March 2005

Personnel
David Torn - guitars, live-sampling and manipulation
Tim Berne - alto saxophone
Craig Taborn - Fender Rhodes, Hammond B3, mellotron, bent circuits
Matt Chamberlain (track 10), Tom Rainey (tracks 1-9 & 11) - drums

References

ECM Records albums
David Torn albums
Albums produced by Manfred Eicher
2007 albums